Friedemann Layer (30 October 1941 – 3 November 2019) was an Austrian conductor. He was assistant to Herbert von Karajan in Ulm and to Karl Böhm. In 1989, he conducted a film version of Der Schauspieldirektor, with Zdzisława Donat and Christian Boesch in the cast.

Layer was chief conductor of the Opéra national de Montpellier from 1994 to 2007.

Selected discography
 Henze - Symphony No 10; 4 Poemi; La Selva Incantata. Montpellier National Orchestra
 Mieczysław Karłowicz - Concerto for Violin and Orchestra. Montpellier Languedoc-Roussillon National Orchestra
 Alfano - Risurrezione Accord
 Offenbach - Die Rheinnixen Accord
 Respighi - La campana sommersa Accord
 Lidarti - Esther oratorio in Hebrew. Accord.
 Ponchielli - Marion Delorme Accord
 Zoltán Kodály - Háry János sung in Hungarian, with French narration by Gérard Depardieu. Accord
 Cilea - L'arlesiana Accord
 Antoine Mariotte -  Salomé Accord

References

1941 births
2019 deaths
Male conductors (music)
21st-century Austrian conductors (music)
21st-century male musicians